Bridget Hill is an American attorney and politician from Wyoming. She is the attorney general of Wyoming.

Early life and education 

Hill was raised on a ranch near Saratoga, Wyoming. She earned a Bachelor of Arts and a Juris Doctor from the University of Wyoming College of Law.

Career 

Hill clerked for Justices Larry Lehman and Michael Golden of the Wyoming Supreme Court.

In 2013, Governor Matt Mead appointed Hill the director of the Office of State Lands and Investments.

In November 2018, Governor-elect Mark Gordon announced Hill as his nominee for attorney general, pending approval by the Wyoming Legislature, to succeed Peter K. Michael. She was sworn into office on March 1, 2019. On January 29, 2021, Hill announced that her office would not pursue criminal charges against Joseph Hubert Hart, a retired Catholic bishop accused of sexual abuse.

References

External links 

21st-century American women lawyers
21st-century American lawyers
Living people
People from Saratoga, Wyoming
University of Wyoming alumni
University of Wyoming College of Law alumni
Wyoming Attorneys General
Wyoming lawyers
Wyoming Republicans
1974 births